The 2012 Eneco Tour was the eighth running of the Eneco Tour cycling stage race. It started on August 6 in Waalwijk in the Netherlands and ended on August 12 in Geraardsbergen, Belgium, after seven stages. It was the 20th race of the 2012 UCI World Tour season.

The race was won by  rider Lars Boom, who claimed the leader's white jersey on the final day after finishing second to  rider Alessandro Ballan on the queen stage, and held enough of an advantage to assume the leader's jersey with his result.

In the race's other classifications, 's Giacomo Nizzolo won the red jersey for the points classification, after winning a stage during the event, and Laurens De Vreese of  won the "combativity" classification for most points awarded at each of the intermediate sprints during the event. Despite not winning a stage during the event,  finished at the head of the teams classification, after placing three riders – Chavanel, Terpstra and Michał Kwiatkowski, who was eighth – in the top ten of the final general classification standings.

Schedule
The race consisted of seven stages, including two time trial stages; one individual time trial in Ardooie, and a team time trial, in Sittard. Also included in the parcours for the first time was the Muur van Geraardsbergen, famous for its presence in the Tour of Flanders single-day race.

Participating teams
As the Eneco Tour was a UCI World Tour event, all eighteen UCI ProTeams were invited automatically and obligated to send a squad. Three other squads were given wildcard places into the race, and as such, formed the event's 21-team peloton. Among the competitors was Alberto Contador, in his first race since returning from a doping ban.

The twenty-one teams that competed in the race were:

Stages

Stage 1
6 August 2012 — Waalwijk (Netherlands) to Middelburg (Netherlands), 

The opening stage saw the riders contest five different intermediate sprints on the route from Waalwijk to Middelburg, with the final two intermediate sprint points – one Eneco Bonisprint in Vrouwenpolder and one Checkpoint Primus sprint, just outside Domburg – coming on a finishing circuit  in length, around the coast in Zeeland. The finish in Middelburg, and all the later stages, awarded bonus seconds towards the general classification, unlike in previous years. The day's breakaway consisted of a pair of riders as  rider Pablo Urtasun was joined at the front by Belgian rider Staf Scheirlinckx, riding for one of the three home wildcard teams, .

The duo extended their advantage to a maximum of around eight-and-a-half minutes around halfway into the stage, but several teams sent riders to the front of the main field in order to bring back the lead pair towards the peloton before the finishing loop. They ultimately did so, as the leaders were caught  prior to the finish, while  led the field across the finish line for the first time. 's Tim Declercq attacked off the front of the field around halfway through the lap, but was ultimately brought back. A crash in the peloton reduced numbers – to around thirty riders – for the bunch sprint, where 's Marcel Kittel held off the rest of the field for his first victory since June's Ster ZLM Toer. Kittel finished ahead of  rider Arnaud Démare and 's Taylor Phinney, the 2011 opening stage winner, to the line; the latter sprinting after a mishap with team-mate Adam Blythe, who finished fifth.

Stage 2
7 August 2012 — Sittard (Netherlands), team time trial (TTT)

However, the stage was predominantly run in the far north-west of Germany, passing through the villages of Tüddern, Höngen, Süsterseel and Hillensberg, where there was a small climb at the intermediate time-point. Thus, who were bottom of the classification, after recording the highest cumulative score for their best three riders, were the first team to set off on the stage.

Their time held until  came across the line; despite losing three riders from the train, including their highest-placed rider from the previous day, Aidis Kruopis, they still recorded the quickest time by a substantial margin at that point. Their time of 21' 09" was not beaten by the other teams, despite ,  and  all coming within five seconds of the time, and as such, Jens Keukeleire became the race leader, with four of his team-mates also in the same overall time.

Stage 3
8 August 2012 — Riemst (Belgium) to Genk (Belgium), 

Just as it was the previous day, the majority of the stage was contested in a different country from the start and finish locations. After an opening loop in Belgium, the stage moved into the Netherlands and contested a circuit around the Limburgish town of Valkenburg aan de Geul, the location of the UCI Road World Championships; the circuit included climbs of the Bemelerberg (twice) and the Cauberg – both prominent in the single-day Amstel Gold Race held in the spring – before heading back towards Belgium and the eventual finish to the stage in Genk.

Halfway around the circuit, the peloton had the lead quartet in their sights with only Vanlandschoot making an effort to remain clear and tried to make a solo attempt to stay off the front until the finish. 's David Tanner also made a late attack for victory, but he too was unsuccessful; and after Kittel's team changed their focus to setting up John Degenkolb for the victory – after Kittel punctured – it was  sprinter Theo Bos that crossed the finish line first, for his maiden World Tour victory. Keukeleire finished within the peloton to maintain his overall lead, and was hoping to maintain the lead until Saturday's penultimate stage time trial.

Stage 4
9 August 2012 — Heers (Belgium) to Bergen op Zoom (Netherlands), 

The fourth stage of the race was a predominantly flat ride from Heers in the Belgian province of Limburg to Bergen op Zoom in the neighbouring North Brabant province over the border in the Netherlands.

As it was the previous day, it was  holding station on the front of the peloton by protecting the leader of the general classification, Jens Keukeleire. The squad brought the time gap down gradually, in order to maintain Keukeleire's lead on the road through the intermediate sprint points of the stage. ,  and  all helped out with the chase of the lead sextet, reducing the gap to under a minute inside of  remaining of the stage. Boonen finished fourth ahead of Kristoff to take the race lead definitively from Keukeleire.

Stage 5
10 August 2012 — Hoogerheide (Netherlands) to Aalter (Belgium), 

The final transitional stage of the race saw the peloton start the day in Hoogerheide, best known for its annual World Cup race in the cyclo-cross discipline, before moving back into Belgium before the finish.

Delage exited the lead quartet not long after – due to his close proximity to Boonen in the general classification – and left the other three riders to try and extend their lead over the main field as the kilometres passed. With added help from Jens Keukeleire's  team, the breakaway were not allowed to hold an advantage into the finishing circuit; indeed they were brought back several kilometres before the loop commenced, with Boonen's team-mate Gert Steegmans taking the three bonus seconds on offer for the intermediate sprint, with Keukeleire not attempting to take time at the line. The field remained together until the finish where 's Giacomo Nizzolo just managed to fend off the advances of  rider Jürgen Roelandts, to take his third win of the season and his first career World Tour victory, by inches. Boonen maintained his overall lead by finishing fifth on the stage, despite nearly crashing in the closing stages.

Stage 6
11 August 2012 — Ardooie (Belgium), individual time trial (ITT)

A perfectly flat out-and-back ride around Ardooie was the basis for the penultimate day time trial, covering  in distance; the time trial was also set to open up time gaps within the top placings in the general classification after each of the mass-start stages provided sprint finishes and the team time trial saw four teams finish within five seconds of one another; the top ten overall were covered by six seconds. As was customary of time trial stages, the riders set off in reverse order from where they were ranked in the general classification at the end of the previous stage.

It was not until 's Markel Irizar – who had started almost 45 minutes after Boaro – set the quickest time at the intermediate time-point and eventually recorded the quickest time at the finish, breaking 21 minutes with a time of 20' 57". Irizar held top spot for around another quarter of an hour before Taylor Phinney – winner of the prologue stage at the 2011 race – of the  surpassed that time by almost half a minute; most of the time gain was achieved in the second half of the course, as he was marginally behind the mark of Irizar at the intermediate time-check, and eventually finished with a time of 20' 30".

Phinney's time was ultimately beaten by only one other rider as Canadian champion Svein Tuft repeated Phinney's achievements; he was also slower than Irizar at the time-check, but saw off Phinney's time by five seconds. 's Sylvain Chavanel was the only rider to go quicker than Irizar to halfway, but he faded in the second half of the course to a sixth place stage finish, twenty seconds off Tuft's time, and two seconds ahead of Boaro's returning team-mate Alberto Contador, who moved into the top ten overall, having earlier talked down his chances for the stage. Contador moved up at the expense of both Boonen and Keukeleire – the top two heading into the stage – who lost 1' 01" and 1' 08" respectively to Tuft, who took the overall lead. Tuft's lead was four seconds ahead of  rider Lars Boom, with Chavanel 16 seconds behind Tuft in third.

Stage 7
12 August 2012 — Maldegem (Belgium) to Geraardsbergen (Belgium), 

The final day of the race saw the remaining riders contest the event's queen stage, which would see the overall classification being decided. After a relatively flat opening third to the stage from the start in Maldegem, the remainder of the  parcours was packed with climbs. In total, there were sixteen climbs with eight climbs being utilised. Of those, one was climbed once – the Hurdumont, with an average gradient of 8% – with six being ascented twice, and the climb that the stage was built around, the Muur van Geraardsbergen, was climbed on three occasions. The stage also finished at the bottom of the Muur van Geraardsbergen – the Wall of Grammont; formerly an iconic part of the Tour of Flanders – on the cobbles of the "vesten" in Geraardsbergen itself.

After a quickly-paced first hour of racing, a nine-rider breakaway formed just after the  mark of the stage. Of the nine riders, three – 's Pavel Brutt,  rider Linus Gerdemann and Gert Steegmans of  – were inside of 90 seconds behind the overall leader coming into the stage, Svein Tuft, riding for the  team. As a result, the peloton did not allow for the lead group to extend a substantial advantage over themselves; indeed, it remained below three minutes for the entire stage. Tuft and Steegmans' team-mate Tom Boonen, the winner of the Muur-less Tour of Flanders earlier in the season both suffered punctures within the peloton as the gap was closing, but both were eventually able to rejoin the main field after several kilometres of chasing. Tuft would later cost himself a chance of third place overall; he received a 20-second time penalty for taking a water bottle inside of the final  of the stage.

The lead group was brought back by the time the riders climbed the Muur for the second time. The move was quickly shut down but Jan Bakelants of  soon counter-attacked and managed to achieve a buffer of around 40 seconds with  remaining. Bakelants stayed off the front until the final Muur climb, but provided Burghardt's team-mate, Alessandro Ballan – winner of the 2007 Tour of Flanders – with the ammunition to attack. He was joined on the descent by  rider Lars Boom, who in second place overall at four seconds behind Tuft, provided the race-deciding move. Ballan and Boom stayed away until the end; Ballan celebrated the stage victory, while Boom did likewise for the overall win. Boom later praised the organisers for using the Muur, and hoped it would remain in the race for the foreseeable future.

Classification leadership table

References

External links

Eneco Tour
Benelux Tour
Eneco Tour
Eneco Tour